Nenad Panić (born 12 January 1984) is a Serbian football forward who plays for SV Stockerau.

External links
 
 Nenad Panić stats at utakmica.rs
 Nenad Panić stats at footballdatabase.eu

1984 births
Living people
People from Kladovo
Association football forwards
Serbian footballers
Serbian expatriate footballers
FK Železničar Beograd players
Red Star Belgrade footballers
FK Čukarički players
FK Javor Ivanjica players
FK Hajduk Kula players
Floridsdorfer AC players
SV Würmla players
SC-ESV Parndorf 1919 players
SV Stockerau players
Serbian SuperLiga players
Expatriate footballers in Austria
Serbian expatriate sportspeople in Austria